Turran Coleman (born May 20, 2002), known professionally as Luh Kel, is an American singer and rapper. He gained popularity after releasing his debut single "Wrong" in 2019, which peaked at number 37 on the Billboard Hot R&B / Hip-Hop Songs chart and spawned a remix with Lil TJay. The official music video gained over 105 million views on YouTube.

Early life
Kel was born in St. Louis, Missouri. He began freestyle rapping with his cousin Kai, and gained popularity on Instagram. He initially recorded songs in his grandparents' home. Kel was a member of the local R&B group, Project X.

Career 
Kel released his single "Wrong" on April 5, 2019. The song peaked at number 37 on the Billboard Hot R&B / Hip-Hop Songs chart. It was certified Gold by RIAA. "Wrong" gained him global recognition, with the song being played worldwide, shared on streaming services and social media platforms like YouTube and TikTok.

Discography

Studio albums

Singles

As lead artist

Guest appearances

References

External links 
 

2002 births
Living people
21st-century American singers
American male rappers
African-American male singers
Musicians from St. Louis
Rappers from St. Louis
Singers from Missouri
21st-century American male musicians